Jerry Lamb Hiu-Fung (Chinese: 林曉峰) (born 28 September 1970) is a Hong Kong actor, singer, television presenter, and DJ.

Career
In 1993, Jerry joined Wharf Cable Television. In 1994, he appeared in the film He's a Woman, She's a Man and was appreciated by Eric Tsang; shortly after that, he joined Eric Tsang as a cohost of the Super Trio Series, a variety show on Television Broadcasts Limited (TVB). 

In 1995, he portrayed the young lackey Pou-pan in the film Young and Dangerous, becoming one of his best-known roles. As an actor, his best performance was seen in the 1996 film The Log with Michael Wong and Kent Cheng. A nomination for Best Supporting Actor was presented to Lamb for The Log.

In 2007, he joined Asia Television Limited as a program host. In 2012, he returned to TVB as a host and hosted several shows. In 2018, he hosted several talk shows for ViuTV.

In 2021, in mainland China, he participated in the mainland program Call Me by Fire, and became one of the "brothers in the Greater Bay Area".

In 2022, he will guest host the Chinese New Year Gala of the Guangdong Radio and Television Station for the first time and will appear as a singer in the music program Infinity and Beyond/Endless Melody（声生不息）.

Personal life
Jerry is the younger brother of DJ, pop singer, and actor Jan Lamb and radio personality-turned-singer Sandy Lamb (林姍姍). He is the nephew of actor Ti Lung and his cousin is actor Shaun Tam Chun Yin.

In 2002, Jerry married Lily Hong, and they have two sons. In September 2020, Lily Hong publicly admitted she divorced him.

Filmography

Television

Film

Preside Over

TV host

References

External links
 

1970 births
Living people
20th-century Hong Kong male actors
21st-century Hong Kong male actors
Hong Kong male film actors
Hong Kong male television actors
Hong Kong television presenters
TVB actors